Loose: The Concert is a live album by Canadian singer Nelly Furtado. The DVD was recorded at Air Canada Centre in Toronto, Ontario. The CD was recorded at the  Wamu Theater at Madison Square Garden in New York City and the Paramount Theatre in Oakland, California during the Get Loose Tour. The DVD and accompanying CD of the concert was released on November 19, 2007 in United Kingdom and on December 4 in United States.

Background
Nelly Furtado released her first live CD/DVD after the huge success of her third album Loose which was released over one year before the release of her DVD especially that her album has been certified gold or platinum in 31 countries and global sales have surpassed nine million. The DVD originated from the Get Loose Tour concert that happened on the April 4, 2007 at the Air Canada Centre in Toronto. It was directed by Raphael Ouellet with Aaron A who was also an audio engineer. A DVD extra includes a 30-minute documentary of the tour.

Track listing

Charts

Certifications

Release history

References

External links
Official German DVD promotional website

Nelly Furtado albums
2007 live albums